Scrobipalpa otregata is a moth in the family Gelechiidae. It was described by Povolný in 1972. It is found in northern Iran and Palestine.

The forewings are dirty whitish. The hindwings are grey to dark grey, tinged with whitish.

References

Scrobipalpa
Moths described in 1972